Taintsville is an unincorporated community in Seminole County, Florida, United States, located between Oviedo and Chuluota. On December 14, 1971, it was formally designated as the Village of Taintsville by Seminole County. The population is about 80 people.

The community's name was derived by residents saying "t ain't" Oviedo and "t ain't" Chuluota.

References

External links

Unincorporated communities in Seminole County, Florida
Unincorporated communities in Florida
1971 establishments in Florida
Populated places established in 1971